Priya Kuriyan is an Indian comic book writer, illustrator and animation filmmaker, based in the city of Bengaluru, Karnataka. She is the author of the comic book Ammachi's Glass, and the author of the picture book and children's adaptation of the writer Perumal Murugan's acclaimed novel Poonachi. Kuriyan was the recipient of the Big Little Book Award at the Mumbai Literature Festival in 2019.

Kuriyan graduated from the National Institute of Design, Ahmedabad in 2004 and began her career as an illustrator for Tulika Books. She has also collaborated with the author Devapriya Roy for the graphic novel Indira (2018), based on the life of the former prime minister Indira Gandhi. As an animation filmmaker, Kuriyan directed educational animation films for the Children's Film Society, India and episodes for the Indian edition of Sesame Street (Galli Galli Sim Sim).

Books 

 Drawing the Line: Indian Women Fight Back (eds., 2015) Zubaan Books . .
 Ammachi's Glasses (2017) Tulika Books . .
 Poonachi: Lost in the Forest (adaptation of Perumal Murugan's Poonachi, 2020) Red Panda Westland Imprint. .

References

Living people
Indian comics writers
Female comics writers
Indian illustrators
Indian women illustrators
Indian women filmmakers
Indian animators
Indian women animators
National Institute of Design alumni
Year of birth missing (living people)
Women artists from Karnataka
Artists from Bangalore